Alfred Rasho is an Iraqi Assyrian documentary filmmaker.

About

Alfred Rasho is a documentary filmmaker of Assyrian descent.  He is the president of Roxie Media Corporation, an audio-visual communications company that produces film, video and multimedia, based in Chicago, Ill.

Documentary films

Nubia and the Mysteries of Kush –  Sudan
Assyria: A Nation of Artifacts – Iraq
Adolescents: Current Issues – Chicago
Runaways – Chicago

See also
List of Assyrians

External links
Official Website: Roxie Media Corporation

Living people
People from Chicago
Iraqi Assyrian people
American people of Iraqi-Assyrian descent
Year of birth missing (living people)